Bankers' Books Evidence Act, 1891 is an act in India dating from the British colonial rule, that is still in force largely unchanged.

History 

In the late 19th century, the banking industry in India was a rapidly developing industry. Every year, new banks were being established, some by Indian businessmen, and others by mostly European owners. The main question which arose was whether the rules of evidence in Indian banking would be governed by British legislation, as India was then a British colony. As a result, it was decide to adapt and adopt the Bankers' Books Evidence Act, 1879 of the British Parliament to Indian banking. The Indian Bankers' Books Evidence Act, 1891 was therefore enacted and continues to be in force to the present day.

Tenets and Precepts 
The main tenets and precepts of the Act are that whenever any Bank or Banker is compelled to provide evidence to a court or judge, the original documents need not be produced and that a copy of the original documents are sufficient for legal purposes.

Today, the Act is also in force in the former British colonies of Pakistan and Bangladesh, which were formerly ruled as parts of undivided India.

Review and Reform 

The Act has been further amended by the Information Technology Act, 2000 which expanded the meaning and scope of Bankers Books to include computer documents, files and external storage. Now any banking related evidence can be produced in electronic format with no requirement for paperwork.

Court Cases involving the Act 

There have been many court cases involving the Bankers' Books Evidence Act, 1891:

 M/s ICICI Bank Limited v. Kapil Dev Sharma
 Sonu and Amar v. The State of Haryana
 Om Prakash v. The Central Bureau of Investigation
 M/s Ashoka Chemicals v. Bharatiya Hindu Shudhi Sabha Trust
 Ishwar Das Jain v. Sohan Lal
 Radheshyam G. Garg v. Safiyabai Ibrahim Lightwalla

References

External links 
The Text of the Act
Indian Parliament version

Law of India
1891 in law
Negotiable instrument law
Acts of the Imperial Legislative Council
1891 in British law
1891 in India